James Harrison (30 August 1899 – 2 May 1959) was a Labour Party politician in the United Kingdom.

He was elected as Member of Parliament (MP) for Nottingham East at the 1945 general election, and held the seat until its abolition for the 1955 general election.  He was then returned for the new Nottingham North constituency, and died in office in May 1959, aged 59.

No by-election was called after his death, and the Nottingham North seat remained vacant until Parliament was dissolved on 18 September for the 1959 general election.

References

External links 
 

1899 births
1959 deaths
Labour Party (UK) MPs for English constituencies
National Union of Railwaymen-sponsored MPs
UK MPs 1945–1950
UK MPs 1950–1951
UK MPs 1951–1955
UK MPs 1955–1959